Keston Ellis Davies (born 2 October 1996) is a Welsh professional footballer who plays as a defender for The New Saints. He was a Wales Under-21 international.

Club career
After playing for the foundation phase of the Swansea City academy between the ages of eight to 11, Davies left to join Fulham's academy before returning to Swansea at the age of 15.

On 14 July 2017, Davies joined League Two club Yeovil Town on loan until the end of the season. Davies made his EFL debut for Yeovil against Luton Town, on 5 August 2017. Davies was recalled to Swansea in January 2018, having only made five appearances for Yeovil.

On 31 August 2018, Davies signed for League Two club Notts County on loan until the end of the season.

In July 2019 he joined The New Saints.

Career statistics

Honours

The New Saints
Cymru Premier: 2021–22
Welsh Cup: 2021–22

References

1996 births
Living people
Footballers from Swansea
Welsh footballers
Association football central defenders
Swansea City A.F.C. players
Fulham F.C. players
Yeovil Town F.C. players
Notts County F.C. players
The New Saints F.C. players
English Football League players
Cymru Premier players
Wales youth international footballers